Charles Walter Stetson (March 25, 1858 – July 21, 1911) was an American artist often described as a "colorist" for his rich use of color.

Life
Stetson was born in Tiverton Four Corners, Rhode Island on March 25, 1858. His father was a Baptist preacher, and the family faced economic worries.

Stetson was a self-taught painter. At the age of 14 he began painting, and at the age of 20 he opened his own studio in Providence, Rhode Island. He became friends with fellow artists Edward Bannister and George William Whitaker. Their meetings together resulted in the founding of the Providence Art Club on February 19, 1880.

He married Charlotte Perkins in 1884. Their only child was born in 1885, they were separated in 1888, and they divorced amicably in 1894. Not long after, Stetson married Charlotte's cousin and closest friend, poet Grace Ellery Channing. After marrying Grace, Stetson moved to California, and then in 1901 they moved to Rome, Kingdom of Italy.

Stetson died in Rome in 1911.

Influence and legacy
Stetson was more widely known outside of the state than other Rhode Island artists of his time. His work stood out for its allegorical, imaginative qualities and greater richness of color.

Honors
Stetson was inducted into the Rhode Island Heritage Hall of Fame in 2011.

References

Further reading
Endure: The Diaries of Charles Walter Stetson, edited by Mary Armfield Hill, Temple University Press (1985)  
The Diaries of Charlotte Perkins Gilman, edited by Denise D. Knight, University Press of Virginia (1994)

External links
Charles Walter Stetson, Biography and examples of his work

1858 births
1911 deaths
People from Tiverton, Rhode Island
Painters from Rhode Island
19th-century American painters
American male painters
20th-century American painters
19th-century American male artists
20th-century American male artists